Yodit Getahun (born 12 February 1985) is an Ethiopian beauty pageant contestant. She was crowned Miss Ethiopia World for 2003, represented Ethiopia in three International pageants, and was awarded two titles. She participated in the "Miss Tourism of the Globe" Contest in Moscow, Russia where she won a minor sponsor title called "Miss Neva 2003". She was awarded the "Miss Congeniality" title at Miss Earth beauty pageant in Manila, Philippines. She was also sponsored by London-based Ethiopian Life Foundation, and participated in the Miss International Beauty Pageant in Tokyo, Japan.

Early life
Yodit Getahun was born in Dire Dawa, Ethiopia in 1985. She attended Addis Ababa University but did not graduate.

Miss Ethiopia World and controversy
In 2003, Getahun won the Miss Ethiopia World beauty pageant, run by the London-based Ethiopian Life Foundation. As the winner of the title, Getahun was due to be paid 30,000 ETBirr over her year as title holder, to be the spokesperson for the Ethiopian Life Foundation. She started working with Dawn of Hope, and Ethiopian association working against HIV/AIDS, on a promotional film, but did so with permission from her managers at the Ethiopian Life Foundation, in breach of her contract. The project was ultimately unfinished.

The controversy escalated when Getahun refused to return to Ethiopia after representing Ethiopia at Miss International 2003 and Miss Earth 2003, suspending her education and remaining in the Philippines for almost 6 months after the Miss Earth pageant to try to secure movie deals. She was therefore stripped of her title mid-reign in February 2004, becoming the only Ethiopian girl ever to be stripped of a national beauty title. She was succeeded by her first runner up, Muna Fikremariam.

Getahun also never returned to Ethiopia to hand over her crown to her successor at Miss Universe Ethiopia 2004, Ferehiyewot Abebe, who went on to become the first Ethiopian girl to go to Miss Universe in 2004.

Getahun apparently returned to Ethiopia in March 2006.

See also
Miss Tourism of the Globe 2003
Miss Earth 2003
Miss International

References

External links
 MISS ETHIOPIA WEBSITE
 STATEMENT IN TADIAS MAGAZINE 
 YODIT "CONTACTS" DAWN OF HOPE
 MISS ETHIOPIA WORLD 2005
 OFFICIAL PRESS STATEMENT ON DETHRONEMENT
 YODIT GETAHUN IS DETHRONED

1985 births
Addis Ababa University alumni
Miss Earth 2003 contestants
Miss International 2003 delegates
Living people
Ethiopian beauty pageant winners
People from Dire Dawa